Abdul Rehman Memon or A. R. Memon is a Pakistani electrical engineer and educator. He has been a Founding Vice Chancellor of Quaid-e-Awam University of Engineering, Science and Technology and a professor of electrical engineering at the Mehran University of Engineering and Technology where he also served as the Vice Chancellor.

References

External links
 Atta ur Rehman Memon at the tripod.com
 Atta ur Rehman Memon in newports.edu.pk

Living people
Pakistani electrical engineers
1941 births
Academic staff of Mehran University of Engineering & Technology
Vice-Chancellors of the Mehran University of Engineering & Technology
Academic staff of Hamdard University
 People from Matiari District